Olivia Purcell (born 5 September 2000) is an Australian rules footballer with the Melbourne Football Club in the AFL Women's (AFLW).

Early life
Purcell was born in Geelong, Victoria and is the second-youngest of five sisters. The family moved to the Sunshine Coast in Queensland when she was a young child before returning to Geelong where Purcell attended Sacred Heart College for school. As well as playing school football, Purcell played in local leagues with clubs such as St Mary's, before playing with the Geelong Falcons in 2018 and helping the team win the premiership in the TAC Cup.

As a result of her success at junior level, Purcell received multiple selections in the TAC Cup's "Team of the Year" and was named in the 2018 AFLW Under-18 All-Australian representative team. In the same year she also helped Geelong's VFL Women's team reach the grand final, and was subsequently drafted with selection number fourteen in the 2018 AFL Women's draft by the club.

AFL Women's career

Purcell made her AFLW debut during the first round of the 2019 season, against Collingwood at GMHBA Stadium. The 2020 AFL Women's season saw Purcell obtain her first AFL Women's All-Australian team selection, named in the half forward position.

It was revealed that Purcell was likely to request a trade to Melbourne in May 2021 in order to play with a team contending for a flag. Purcell was traded to Melbourne on 8 June.

Honours 
Individual
 2018 Under-18 All Australian team
 2019 AFL Women's Rising Star Nominee: Round 5
 Geelong Football Club AFLW Best & Fairest: 2020
 AFL Women's All-Australian team: 2020 (Half forward)
Club
 2018 TAC Cup Girls Premiers: 2018

References

External links 

Geelong Football Club (AFLW) players
2000 births
Living people
Australian rules footballers from Victoria (Australia)
Sportswomen from Victoria (Australia)
Geelong Falcons players (NAB League Girls)
Melbourne Football Club (AFLW) players